Eddie Edwards (born April 25, 1954)  is a former American football defensive end in the National Football League (NFL).

Edwards was born in Sumter, South Carolina and raised in Fort Pierce, Florida. He played high school football at Fort Pierce Central High School. He attended the University of Miami, where he was a consensus All-American defensive end. In 1976, he was awarded the Jack Harding Memorial Award as the most valuable player for the Hurricanes, as selected by coaches vote.

Edwards was drafted in the first round of the 1977 NFL Draft, the third overall selection, by the Cincinnati Bengals. He played for the Bengals for 12 seasons from 1977 until his retirement in 1988.  During that time, he recovered 17 fumbles and set a franchise record with 83.5 sacks.  However, only 47.5 of those sacks are "official", as the NFL did not consider sacks an official statistic until 1982.  His 47.5 official sacks remained a Bengals franchise record until Carlos Dunlap passed him in 2015.

Edwards was inducted into the University of Miami Sports Hall of Fame in 1989.

References

External links
 University of Miami Sports Hall of Fame Inductees

1954 births
Living people
Sportspeople from Sumter, South Carolina
American football defensive ends
Miami Hurricanes football players
Cincinnati Bengals players
Players of American football from South Carolina
National Football League replacement players
Ed Block Courage Award recipients